Robert William Sennewald (born November 21, 1929) is a retired United States Army general.

Early life and education
Sennewald was born on November 21, 1929 in St. Louis, Missouri as the only child of Ferdinand and Mabel Sennewald. He was commissioned in 1951 through the Reserve Officer Training Corps upon graduation from Iowa State University with a degree in physical education. While at Iowa State he was affiliated with Phi Kappa Psi fraternity. Sennewald is an Iowa State University Distinguished Alumni Award winner.

Military career

Sennewald's assignments included command of: 6th Battalion, 15th Artillery Regiment in Vietnam; Division Artillery, 4th Infantry Division (Mechanized) at Fort Carson, Colorado; and the United States Army Training Center at Fort Dix, New Jersey. He also served as Assistant Chief of Operations (C3/J3) for the ROK/US Forces in Korea, and Deputy Commander, United States Pacific Command.

Sennewald served as Commander in Chief, United Nations Command/Commander in Chief, ROK/U.S. Combined Forces Command/Commander, United States Forces Korea/Commanding General, Eighth United States Army (CINCUNC/CINCCFC/COMUSFK/CG EUSA) from 1982 to 1984; and as Commanding General, United States Army Forces Command from 1984 to 1986. Sennewald was promoted to four star rank on May 24, 1982.

Sennewald retired from the United States Army in 1986. In 1994, he established Sennewald Associates which does consulting work on national security issues, and has served as Chairman of the Army and Air Force Mutual Aid Association, on the board of the Armed Services YMCA, and on the Advisory Council of the United States Field Artillery Association.

See also

List of United States Army four-star generals

References

1929 births
United States Army personnel of the Korean War
United States Army personnel of the Vietnam War
Iowa State University alumni
Living people
Recipients of the Defense Distinguished Service Medal
Recipients of the Distinguished Service Medal (US Army)
Recipients of the Defense Superior Service Medal
Recipients of the Legion of Merit
United States Army generals